Won Seon-pil (born 6 August 1994) is a South Korean handball player for Incheon Sports Council and the South Korean Republic national team.

References

External links

1994 births
Living people
South Korean female handball players
Asian Games medalists in handball
Handball players at the 2014 Asian Games
Asian Games gold medalists for South Korea
Medalists at the 2014 Asian Games
People from Jeongseon County
Handball players at the 2020 Summer Olympics
Sportspeople from Gangwon Province, South Korea
21st-century South Korean women